Anthony Cullen (born 30 September 1969) was an English professional footballer who played as a winger for Sunderland.

References

1969 births
Living people
Footballers from Gateshead
English footballers
Association football wingers
Sunderland A.F.C. players
Carlisle United F.C. players
Rotherham United F.C. players
Bury F.C. players
Swansea City A.F.C. players
Doncaster Rovers F.C. players
Gateshead F.C. players
Radcliffe F.C. players
Salford City F.C. players
Jarrow Roofing Boldon Community Association F.C. players
Tow Law Town F.C. players
Seaham Red Star F.C. players
English Football League players